Bill Doran may refer to:
 Bill Doran (motorcyclist) (1916–1973), Grand Prix motorcycle road racer
 Bill Doran (second baseman) (born 1958), American baseball second baseman
 Bill Doran (third baseman) (1898–1978), American baseball third baseman
 William Doran (1834–1903), mayor of Hamilton, Ontario
 William C. Doran (1884–1965), associate justice of the California Court of Appeal